The Godett cabinet was the 23rd Cabinet of the Netherlands Antilles.

Composition
The cabinet was composed as follows:

|rowspan="2"|Minister of General Affairs
|Ben Komproe
|FOL
|22 July 2003
|-
|Mirna Louisa-Godett
|FOL
|11 August 2003
|-
|rowspan="3"|Minister of Constitutional Affairs and Interior Affairs
|Russell Voges
|DP
|24 July 2003
|-
|Erroll Cova
|PLKP
|28 July 2003
|-
|Richard Gibson
|NA
|3 February 2004
|-
|Minister of Traffic and Communications
|Richard Salas
|FOL
|22 July 2003
|-
|Minister of Finance
|Ersilia de Lannooy
|PNP
|22 July 2003
|-
|Minister of Economic Affairs 
|Erroll Cova
|PLKP
|22 July 2003
|-
|Minister of Public Health and Social Development
|Joan Theodora-Brewster
|PNP
|22 July 2003
|-
|rowspan="3"|Minister of Education
|Herbert Domacasse 
||UPB
|22 July 2003
|-
|Ersilia de Lannooy
|PNP
|December 2003
|-
|Reynolds A. Oleana
||PDB
|3 February 2004
|-
|rowspan="2"|Minister of Justice
|Ben Komproe
|FOL
|22 July 2003
|-
|Mirna Louisa-Godett acting
|FOL
|2004
|}

 Herbert Domacasse appointed Lieutenant governor of Bonaire

References

Cabinets of the Netherlands Antilles
2003 establishments in the Netherlands Antilles
Cabinets established in 2003
Cabinets disestablished in 2004
2004 disestablishments in the Netherlands Antilles